Bent Røiseland (11 October 1902  – 31 October 1981) was a Norwegian politician for the Liberal Party and later the Liberal People's Party.

He was elected to the Norwegian Parliament from Vest-Agder in 1945, and was re-elected on six occasions. He was President of the Lagting for three terms. During his seventh term, in December 1972, Røiseland joined the Liberal People's Party which split from the Liberal Party over disagreements of Norway's proposed entry to the European Economic Community.

On the local level, Røiseland was a member of Holum municipal council between 1931 and 1940.

He was born in Holme. Outside politics he mainly worked as a farmer. He was a member of the Diocese Council of Agder from 1958 to 1965, and was an auditor-general at the Office of the Auditor General of Norway from 1954 to 1973.

References

1902 births
1981 deaths
Members of the Storting
Liberal Party (Norway) politicians
Vest-Agder politicians
20th-century Norwegian politicians